The 1952 Major League Baseball season was contested from April 15 to October 7, 1952. The Braves were playing their final season in Boston, before the team relocated to Milwaukee the following year, thus, ending fifty seasons without any MLB team relocating.

Awards and honors
Baseball Hall of Fame
Harry Heilmann
Paul Waner
Most Valuable Player
Bobby Shantz, Philadelphia Athletics, P (AL)
Hank Sauer, Chicago Cubs, OF (NL)
Rookie of the Year
Harry Byrd, Philadelphia Athletics, P (AL)
Joe Black, Brooklyn Dodgers, P (NL)
The Sporting News Player of the Year Award
Robin Roberts, Philadelphia Phillies, P
The Sporting News Manager of the Year Award
Eddie Stanky, St. Louis Cardinals

Statistical leaders

Standings

American League

National League

Postseason

Bracket

Managers

American League

National League

Home Field Attendance

Events

June 22 – Boston Braves player Sid Gordon hits a two-run homer over the left field fence at Braves Field. His homer won Gordon the prize of a 100-pound bear cub for being the first Braves player to homer on "State of Maine Day". After the game, Gordon was presented with the animal in the Braves clubhouse.
August 23 – Bob Elliott of the New York Giants is ejected for arguing a strike call during an at-bat against the St. Louis Cardinals at Sportsman's Park. Bobby Hofman completes Elliott's at-bat. Hofman strikes out and is also ejected for arguing.

See also
1952 All-American Girls Professional Baseball League season
1952 Nippon Professional Baseball season

References

External links
1952 Major League Baseball season schedule at Baseball Reference

 
Major League Baseball seasons